Chris Marquette (born October 3, 1984) is an American actor. He is known for his roles in such films as The Tic Code, Freddy vs. Jason, The Girl Next Door, Just Friends, Alpha Dog and Fanboys. He is also known for his series regular roles on Joan of Arcadia and Strong Medicine.

Biography
Marquette has two younger brothers, actors Sean Marquette and Eric. His father was a Cuban refugee and is a nuclear engineer.

He supports charities such as the Sunshine Kids Foundation (to grant wishes of seriously ill, handicapped and abused children), Pediatric AIDS, and the Children's AIDS Fund.

Career
In 1995, he made a brief appearance on Saturday Night Live, season 21, episode 4. The 11-year-old Marquette played a trick-or-treater in the opening Halloween sketch. He forgot his line and whispered "damn" under his breath, before Norm Macdonald helped him out. He also provided the voice of Spencer Lionheart in the "MGM Sing-Alongs" Videos back in 1997. However, his acting debut was in 1998 with the musical drama film The Tic Code. In 2000, he appeared in the Disney Channel movie Up, Up and Away. From 2000 to 2005, he had a supporting role in Lifetime TV's Strong Medicine, playing Marc Delgado, the tween-to-teen son of the series' lead character, Luisa Delgado. In 2004, he starred in The Girl Next Door. The same year, he became a series regular on the CBS show Joan of Arcadia opposite Amber Tamblyn and Jason Ritter (whom Marquette co-starred with in the 2003 slasher film Freddy vs. Jason) before Joan of Arcadia'''s cancellation in early 2005.

Marquette was also given a supporting role in Just Friends with Ryan Reynolds, Amy Smart, Anna Faris and Chris Klein. In 2006's Alpha Dog, Marquette portrays Keith Stratten alongside Emile Hirsch, Justin Timberlake and Ben Foster. He played the best friend of main character Nick Powell in the thriller The Invisible, a remake of a Swedish film, which starred Justin Chatwin and Marcia Gay Harden and was released on April 27, 2007. He has also had supporting/minor roles in the films 61* with Barry Pepper and Thomas Jane, and the Disney Channel original TV movie Up, Up and Away! with Robert Townsend.

Among Marquette's movies is Fanboys, in which he plays obsessed Star Wars fan Linus Poonwah. Fanboys was shot in spring 2006 in New Mexico, and also stars Sam Huntington, Dan Fogler, Jay Baruchel and Veronica Mars Kristen Bell. Another of his acting projects is an independent movie called The Education of Charlie Banks, which was directed by Limp Bizkit's Fred Durst. Whether on purpose or not, Chris frequently appears in movies with a group of actors including Emile Hirsch, Paul Dano, Amanda Seyfried and Nikki Reed. In Infestation, an action comedy by Kyle Rankin that was shot in summer 2007 in Bulgaria, he plays the lead role—a young man named Cooper who has to fight for survival against giant alien insects that have taken over the world. One of his latest projects was Race to Witch Mountain, a modern-day reimagining of Disney's 1975 film Escape to Witch Mountain in which Marquette played the character of Pope—a computer specialist out of MIT, helping the bad guys. Marquette starred alongside Dwayne Johnson, Tom Everett Scott and Ciarán Hinds; the film was released March 2009.

Marquette has also been seen as a guest star on several TV shows, such as ER, Touched by an Angel, 7th Heaven, Miracles, Boston Public and Judging Amy. The latest guest roles include the Showtime TV series Huff; Christopher played James, a friend of Byrd's (Anton Yelchin, whom he also played alongside in Alpha Dog), in episodes Sweet Release, Bethless and Tapping The Squid (all aired 2006). As Christopher Marquette, he returned on-screen, in late 2010, with fellow Joan of Arcadia actor Michael Welch as two friends who murder together in the Criminal Minds' episode entitled "JJ". In 2011 he appeared as Danny, a young homeless patient who is later revealed to be a cannibalistic serial killer in the award-winning medical drama House''.

Filmography

Film

Television

References

External links

1984 births
20th-century American male actors
21st-century American male actors
Living people
American people of Cuban descent
American male child actors
American male film actors
American male television actors
American male voice actors
Hispanic and Latino American male actors
Place of birth missing (living people)